The Peace Medal of the Third World is an award given to those who helped fight for justice and peace in third world countries. The medal is awarded by the United Nations.

Laureates
 Bob Marley, 1978

References

Medals of the United Nations
Peace awards